Bevans, also known as Peters Valley, is an unincorporated community located at the intersection of Bevans Road (County Route 615), Walpack Road (National Park Service Route 615), and Kuhn Road in Sandyston Township of Sussex County, New Jersey. The village is now part of the Delaware Water Gap National Recreation Area. Both the Delaware River and the Old Mine Road are nearby.

History

In 1761, it was named Peters Valley after an early settler, Peter Van Neste. In 1829, it was named Bevans after postmaster James C. Bevans. It was later used as a school, tavern, hotel, dance hall, and residence. The church is surround by a large churchyard. The Peters Valley School of Craft was incorporated in 1970 and uses the Victorian-style Doremus House as its headquarters.

Historic district

The Peters Valley Historic District is a  historic district encompassing the village. It was added to the National Register of Historic Places on February 29, 1980 for its significance in architecture and exploration/settlement. The district includes 17 contributing buildings. Built , the Greek Revival House features a pedimented gable facade and four massive square columns.

Gallery

See also
 National Register of Historic Places listings in Sussex County, New Jersey

References

External links
 
 

Sandyston Township, New Jersey
Unincorporated communities in Sussex County, New Jersey
Unincorporated communities in New Jersey
Delaware Water Gap National Recreation Area